The Lady Fights Back is a 1937 American action film directed by Milton Carruth and written by Brown Holmes and Robert T. Shannon. It is based on the 1937 novel Heather of the High Hand by Arthur Stringer. The film stars Kent Taylor, Irene Hervey, William Lundigan, Willie Best, Joe Sawyer, and Paul Hurst. The film was released on October 1, 1937, by Universal Pictures.

Plot
The plot follows Power company worker Owen Merrill as goes into Muskalala River to make surveys for a dam site, when the head of Muskalala Salmon Club Heather McHale finds out about his intentions, she decides to stop him from building the dam.

Cast

References

External links
 

1937 films
American action films
1930s action films
Universal Pictures films
American black-and-white films
Films directed by Milton Carruth
1930s English-language films
1930s American films